Pygmaeconus papalis is a species of sea snail, a marine gastropod mollusk in the family Conidae.

Description

Distribution

References

 Filmer R.M. (2001). A Catalogue of Nomenclature and Taxonomy in the Living Conidae 1758–1998. Backhuys Publishers, Leiden. 388pp
 Liu J.Y. [Ruiyu] (ed.). (2008). Checklist of marine biota of China seas. China Science Press. 1267 pp.

External links
 Puillandre N. & Tenorio M.J. (2017). A question of rank: DNA sequences and radula characters reveal a new genus of cone snails (Gastropoda: Conidae). Journal of Molluscan Studies. 83(2): 200–210

papalis
Gastropods described in 1875